Google Swiffy was a web-based tool developed by Google that converted SWF files to HTML5. Its main goal was to display Flash contents on devices that do not support Flash, such as iPhone, iPad, and Android Tablets.  Swiffy was shut down July 1, 2016.

Approach
A closed source web service hosted by Google converts SWF to an intermediate representation serialized as JSON. This representation is in turn converted into SVG in the web browser via JavaScript, which is also used for animations. The Swiffy thesis (2012) explains its general approach in the following way:

Supports
Google Swiffy supported a subset of SWF 10, ActionScript 2.0 and ActionScript 3.0.

Supporting browsers
 Google Chrome
 Safari
 Firefox 5+ (partly supported)
 IE9 (partly supported) and IE10
 WebKit-based browsers

Development
Swiffy was started in the summer of 2011 by Google engineering intern Pieter Senster, who joined their mobile advertising team to search for solutions to display Flash content on devices that do not support Flash. Progress on Swiffy was sufficient that Google hired him full-time and formed a team to work on the project. The product manager of Google Swiffy was Marcel Gordon.

Swiffy 6.0.1 was released on February 11, 2014.

Swiffy was shut down July 1, 2016.

Related software
 Wallaby by Adobe converts FLA files to HTML5.
 Mozilla Shumway took a different approach by implementing a virtual machine for SWF in JavaScript.

References

External links
 Google Swiffy Homepage
 Google Swiffy Demos
 Google Code Blog - Swiffy: convert SWF files to HTML5

Adobe Flash
Swiffy
HTML5
Scalable Vector Graphics